Teófilo Barrios (born 23 July 1964) is a retired football defender from Paraguay. A right or left back, he played professional football for Cerro Porteño in Paraguay and Talleres de Córdoba in Argentina.

International 
Barrios made his international debut for the Paraguay national football team on 27 February 1991 in a friendly match against Brazil (1-1). He obtained a total number of 11 international caps, scoring no goals for the national side. Barrios represented his native country at two Copa América's: 1991 and 1993.

External links
 
 

1964 births
Living people
Paraguayan footballers
Paraguay international footballers
Paraguayan expatriate footballers
Association football utility players
Association football defenders
Expatriate footballers in Argentina
1991 Copa América players
1993 Copa América players
Talleres de Córdoba footballers
Cerro Porteño players
Club Presidente Hayes footballers